The 1995-96 EHF Cup Winners' Cup season, TBV Lemgo won the Europe's club handball tournament.

Knockout stage

Elimination round

Round of 32

Round of 16

|}

Quarterfinals

|}

Semifinals

|}

Finals

|}

References 
 Men Handball European Cup Winners Cup 1996

External links 
 EHF Cup Winners' Cup website 

EHF Cup Winners' Cup seasons
1995 in handball
1996 in handball